Cinga Samson (born 1986, Cape Town, South Africa) is a South African contemporary artist known for his figurative oil paintings of large-scale group scenes and self-portraits. Samson’s work is recognisable for his dark palette, his depictions of figures with pupil-less eyes and formal, ceremonious poses.

Samson has had solo exhibitions in New York City and Cape Town, and his work has been included in group shows in Amsterdam, Berlin, Minneapolis, Norway, Vermont, and Mexico.

He currently resides in Cape Town. Samson is represented by White Cube.

Biography
Samson was born in Khayelitsha, Cape Town in 1986 and grew up between eThembeni in the rural Eastern Cape and Cape Town in the Western Cape. Shortly after finishing high school in eThembeni, Samson moved to Khayelitsha, a township outside of Cape Town. He first joined the art studio Isibane Creative Arts, a shared artist space in Khayelitsha where he worked alongside three older artists: Gerald Tabata, Xolile Mtakatya and Luthando Laphuwano.

Samson attended the Stellenbosch Academy of Design and Photography, in Stellenbosch, Western Cape where he studied a one-year course in commercial photography.

Solo Exhibitions

References

1986 births
Living people
African artists
21st-century male artists
South African artists
South African painters
Self-taught artists
Artists from Cape Town